The list of members of the National Assembly of Hungary (2014–2018) is the list of members of the National Assembly – the unicameral legislative body of Hungary – according to the outcome of the Hungarian parliamentary election of 2014. The members of the new National Assembly were installed on May 6, 2014 and their mandates lasted until May 7, 2018. There has been a sizable number of mutations since due to the particular nature of the Hungary constitutional system. New members are supplied from their party lists so the resignation of individual members' seats does not change the balance of power in the National Assembly.

Officials

Speaker
 László Kövér (Fidesz) (May 6, 2014 – May 7, 2018)

First Officer
 Márta Mátrai (Fidesz) (May 6, 2014 – May 7, 2018)

Deputy Speaker for Legislation
 Gergely Gulyás (Fidesz) (May 6, 2014 – October 1, 2017)
 Csaba Hende (Fidesz) (October 2, 2017 – May 7, 2018)

Deputy Speakers
 István Hiller (MSZP)
 István Jakab (Fidesz)
 János Latorcai (KDNP)
 Sándor Lezsák (Fidesz)
 Tamás Sneider (Jobbik)

Father of the House
 Béla Turi-Kovács (Fidesz) (age 78 in 2014)

Baby of the House
 Dóra Dúró (Jobbik) (age 27 in 2014)

Senior Recorders
 Tibor Bana (Jobbik) (age 28 in 2014)
 Gergely Farkas (Jobbik) (age 28 in 2014)
 Anita Heringes (MSZP) (age 29 in 2014)

Leaders of the parliamentary groups
Fidesz: Antal Rogán ; Lajos Kósa ; Gergely Gulyás 
KDNP: Péter Harrach
MSZP: Attila Mesterházy ; József Tóbiás ; Bertalan Tóth 
Jobbik: Gábor Vona ; János Volner 
LMP: András Schiffer ; Erzsébet Schmuck ; Bernadett Szél

Composition

Note: DK, Együtt, PM and Liberals politicians are also technically independent MPs

Members of the National Assembly

By name

By parties of the Coalition Government

Fidesz

KDNP

Opposition parties

MSZP

Jobbik

LMP

Independents

 Zoltán Kész (Veszprém Const. I.)
 Péter Kónya (National List)
Együtt:
 Gordon Bajnai (National List)
 Szabolcs Szabó (Budapest Const. XVII.)
 Zsuzsanna Szelényi

Demokratikus Koalíció:
 Ferenc Gyurcsány (National List)
 Csaba Molnár (National List)
 Lajos Oláh (Budapest Const. V.)
 Ágnes Vadai (National List)
 László Varju

Párbeszéd:
 Tímea Szabó (National List)
MLP - Liberálisok!:
 Gábor Fodor (National List)

Spokespersons of national minorities
Under the 2012 election law, the thirteen officially recognized national minorities are entitled to send minority spokespersons to the National Assembly. They have the same rights as other parliamentarians to address the parliament, but are not entitled to vote.

 Lyubomir Alexov (Serb)
 Halina Csúcs-Pospiech (Polish)
 Félix Farkas (Romani)
 János Fuzik (Slovak)
 Vera Giricz (Rusyn)
 Jaroszlava Hartyányi (Ukrainian)
 Mihály Hepp (Croat)
 Erika Kissné Köles (Slovene)
 Laokratisz Koranisz (Greek)
 Traján Kreszta (Romanian)
 Imre Ritter (German)
 Tamás Turgyán (Armenian)
 Szimeon Varga (Bulgarian)

See also

 Third Orbán Government
 List of Hungarian people

Notes

External links 
Official website of Hungarian National Assembly in Hungarian and English
Representatives of the parliamentary term list (2014-2018) parlament.hu
Informative data on the composition of the National Assembly valasztas.hu
Politics.hu - English-language resource about Hungarian politics

2014